George Harris Kennedy Jr. (February 18, 1925 – February 28, 2016) was an American actor who appeared in more than 100 film and television productions. He played "Dragline" opposite Paul Newman in Cool Hand Luke (1967), winning the Academy Award for Best Supporting Actor for the role and being nominated for the corresponding Golden Globe. He received a second Golden Globe nomination for portraying Joe Patroni in Airport (1970).

Among the notable films he had a significant role in are Cool Hand Luke, Charade, Strait-Jacket, McHale's Navy, Shenandoah, The Sons of Katie Elder, The Flight of the Phoenix, The Dirty Dozen, The Boston Strangler, Guns of the Magnificent Seven, Thunderbolt and Lightfoot, The Good Guys and the Bad Guys,  Airport 1975, Earthquake, The Eiger Sanction, and The Naked Gun.

Kennedy was the only actor to appear in all four films in the Airport series, reprising the role of Joe Patroni three times. He also played Police Captain Ed Hocken in the Naked Gun series of comedy films, and corrupt oil tycoon Carter McKay on the original Dallas television series.

Early life, education and military service 
Kennedy was born on February 18, 1925, in New York City, into a show business family. His father, George Harris Kennedy, a musician and orchestra leader, died when Kennedy was four years old. He was raised by his mother, Helen A. (née Kieselbach), a ballet dancer. His maternal grandfather was a German immigrant; his other ancestry was Irish and English.

Kennedy made his stage debut at age two in a touring company of Bringing Up Father, and by seven was a New York City radio DJ.

Kennedy graduated in 1943 from Chaminade High School in Mineola, Long Island, New York.

Kennedy enlisted in the United States Army during World War II in 1943. He served 16 years, reaching the rank of captain. Kennedy served in the infantry under George S. Patton, fought in the Battle of the Bulge, and earned two Bronze Stars. He re-enlisted after the war and was discharged in the late 1950s due to a back injury.

Career 

His first notable screen role was a military policeman on the TV sitcom The Phil Silvers Show, where he also served as a technical adviser to ensure accuracy for the show's military base setting. Kennedy later described the Silvers show as "a great training ground".

His film career began in 1961 in The Little Shepherd of Kingdom Come. He appeared in several Hollywood movies, including as a sadistic jail guard in the Kirk Douglas modern western Lonely Are the Brave (1962), a ruthless criminal in the Cary Grant suspense film Charade (1963), and in a Joan Crawford thriller, Strait-Jacket (1964).

Kennedy was busy in 1965. He appeared with Gregory Peck in the mystery Mirage, with a large cast led by James Stewart in the plane-crash adventure The Flight of the Phoenix, with John Wayne in the war film In Harm's Way, and with Wayne and Dean Martin in the western The Sons of Katie Elder.

He played the character "Blodgett" in a 1966 episode "Return to Lawrence" of the ABC Western series The Legend of Jesse James.

Then came the role for which he won an Academy Award for Best Supporting Actor in Cool Hand Luke (1967), that of "Dragline," a chain-gang convict who at first resents the new prisoner in camp played by Paul Newman, then comes to idolize the rebellious Luke.

Kennedy followed with films such as The Dirty Dozen, Bandolero!, and The Boston Strangler. In 1970, he appeared in the Academy Award-winning disaster film Airport, in which he played one of its main characters, airline troubleshooter Joe Patroni. He reprised this role in Airport 1975, Airport '77 and The Concorde ... Airport '79, the only cast member to appear in each film of the series.

The Airport franchise helped inspire the Zucker, Abrahams, and Zucker satire Airplane!, in which the filmmakers hoped to cast Kennedy as the bumbling plane dispatcher. The role went to Lloyd Bridges, because Kennedy "couldn't kill off his Airport cash-cow", Jerry Zucker said in 2010.

Kennedy co-starred with Clint Eastwood in two films, Thunderbolt and Lightfoot and The Eiger Sanction, and with ensemble casts in the disaster film Earthquake and the Agatha Christie mystery Death on the Nile.

He also starred in two television series: Sarge, which aired from 1971 to 1972 on NBC, and The Blue Knight, a CBS series that ran for 24 episodes from 1975 to 1976.

Kennedy starred in two Japanese productions, Junya Satō's Proof of the Man in 1977 and Kinji Fukasaku's Virus in 1980. Both films were produced by Haruki Kadokawa and featured extensive international casts and shooting locations. Although Proof of the Man was only released theatrically in Japan and Virus saw a financially unsuccessful truncated cut in the U.S., Kennedy was highly enthusiastic towards his involvement.

In 1984, Kennedy starred opposite Bo Derek in the box-office bomb Bolero. His other films during the 1980s included Savage Dawn, The Delta Force and Creepshow 2, before playing a top supporting role in the comedy film The Naked Gun: From the Files of Police Squad! in 1988, playing Captain Ed Hocken opposite Leslie Nielsen's comical cop Frank Drebin. There were two sequels in which Kennedy again co-starred.

In 1990, Kennedy appeared in the Korean film Mayumi directed by Shin Sang-ok who was best known for having been kidnapped with actress and wife Choi Eun-hee by North Korean leader Kim Jong-il. Mayumi was Shin's attempt at re-entering the South Korean film industry and was the country's submission for the Best Foreign Language Film at the 63rd Academy Awards, but it was not accepted as a nominee. Despite featuring Kennedy, it saw no wide release outside of South Korea and was ultimately a domestic box office failure.

On television, Kennedy starred as Carter McKay in the CBS prime time serial Dallas (1978–1991), appearing from 1988 to 1991. From the mid- to late-1990s, he promoted "Breathasure" tablets in radio and television commercials. Around this time, he reprised his role as McKay in the television films Dallas: J.R. Returns and Dallas: War of the Ewings. In the late 1970s, Kennedy also appeared as a celebrity guest on the television game show Match Game.

In 1998, he voiced Brick Bazooka for the film Small Soldiers. He then made several independent films, before making a 2003 comeback to television in the soap opera The Young and the Restless, playing the character Albert Miller, the biological father to legendary character Victor Newman. In 2005, he made a cameo appearance in the film Don't Come Knocking, playing the director of an ill-fated western.

Kennedy made his final film appearance in The Gambler (2014) as Ed, the dying grandfather of Mark Wahlberg's Jim Bennett. His role lasts for less than two minutes during the film's opening scene, wherein Ed (moments before his death) bequeaths the responsibilities of patriarch to a heartbroken Jim.

Personal life

Marriages and children 
Kennedy was married four times, to three women. In the 1940s, he married Dorothy Gillooly, who had served in the Women's Army Corps. They were divorced in the 1950s; Dorothy returned to her hometown, Buffalo, New York. In 1959, Kennedy married Norma Wurman, also known as Revel Wurman.  The couple had two children, son Christopher and daughter Karianna. Kennedy and Norma divorced the first time in 1971, remarried in 1973, and divorced a second and final time in 1978. That same year, Kennedy married Joan McCarthy (née Castagna), daughter of John Castagna and former wife of William James McCarthy. They remained married until her death in September 2015. The couple adopted three children including Shaunna Kennedy, who later developed drug-abuse problems. In 1998, after Shaunna was declared unfit to raise her daughter Taylor, Kennedy and Joan adopted that grandchild also.

Interests 
Kennedy was friends with James Stewart, and provided the voiceover in a Turner Classic Movies mini-tribute to Stewart.  Kennedy was an aviator who  enjoyed flying and owned a Cessna 210 and Beechcraft Bonanza. Following his experiences working for the Far East Network during WWII and professional involvement with Proof of the Man and Virus, Kennedy maintained a lifelong affinity for Japan and its culture.

Illness and death 
Kennedy resided in Eagle, Idaho, at the time of his death. He died on the morning of February 28, 2016, of a heart ailment at an assisted living facility in Middleton, Idaho, 10 days after his 91st birthday.  He had a history of heart disease.

Filmography

Film

Television

Awards and nominations

Honors 

For his contributions to motion pictures, Kennedy received a star on the Hollywood Walk of Fame, at 6352 Hollywood Boulevard in Hollywood, California.

Writing career 
Kennedy wrote three books. In 1983, he wrote the murder mystery Murder On Location, set on a film shoot. A second novel, Murder on High, was released in 1984. In 2011, he wrote his autobiography, Trust Me.

Notes

References

External links 

 

1925 births
2016 deaths
20th-century American male actors
21st-century American male actors
American male film actors
American male radio actors
American male stage actors
American male television actors
American people of English descent
American people of German descent
American people of Irish descent
Best Supporting Actor Academy Award winners
Male actors from New York (state)
Male Western (genre) film actors
People from Eagle, Idaho
United States Army officers
United States Army personnel of World War II